Discography of Mexican singer Yuridia.

Studio albums

Live albums

Compilation albums

Singles

Music videos

References

http://www.amprofon.com.mx/certificaciones.php?artista=yuridia&titulo=&disquera=&certificacion=todas&anio=todos&categoria=todas&Submitted=Buscar&item=menuCert&contenido=buscar
http://yuridiagaxiola.mforos.com/

Yuridia
Latin pop music discographies